Li Shunxian 李舜弦 (c. 900 – 926, Sichuan) was a Chinese poet celebrated for her beauty and poetic talent. She was a concubine of Wang Yan (Wang Zongyan), the Chinese Emperor of Former Shu. She was famous for being a Chinese woman of Persian ancestry who was an accomplished poet in the Chinese language.

Her Persian family had adopted the Chinese surname Li. After they fled the Huang Chao rebellion into interior China (Sichuan), they rose to prominence in the Chinese court of the Later Shu Kingdom.

It is unknown whether she spoke Persian. It is also unknown whether her parents were immigrants to China or were born in China.

It is believed that Shunxian's family was Zoroastrian because of one line in Shunxian's poem mentioning a "golden bullet for a catapult" which Veshparkar, an Iranian god was known to deploy. However, other scholars such as Chen Mingyuan reason that they were more likely Nestorian Christians because in China the Nestorians were known for their medicine, as Shunxian's brother Li Xu 李珣 was known to have written on. A third possibility is that following the Islamization of Persia, Shunxian's family was Muslim. Nonetheless there is no direct evidence for any of these.

Life

Following the Huang Chao rebellion, Shunxian's family fled to Sichuan in the year 880. This migration was also along with many other Chinese including Emperor Xizong. She had an older brother Li Xun, who was also a poet and pharmacist at the court and wrote a Chinese book on drugs. They were born in Zi prefecture, Sichuan. The family's Persian ethnicity is mentioned in historical texts.

As a concubine in the imperial court, Shunxian held the rank as Madame (夫人) which was just below the title of Empress (consort). Their husband Wang Yan was born in 899, became emperor in 919 at 20 years old, and reigned until 924. He was known for his indulgence in women and wine. It is speculated that Shunxian was around the same age as Wang. It was here in the harem that she began writing her renown poetry.

The Ten-Thousand Quatrains of the Tang collected by Hongmai (洪邁) contains three poems by Shunxian. In medieval China, she is the only non-Chinese woman who composed literature in Chinese. Both she and her brother were known for their poetry, and Shunxian's poems are still preserved and read today.

In 926, Shunxian, Wang Yan, and his other concubines were all brutally massacred by Emperor Li Zhuangzong of Later Tang.

See also
Iranians in China
Former Shu
Liu Chang
Lin Nu

References

External links
http://www.guoxuedashi.com/shici/bk1791y/
http://www.renwen.com/wiki/%E6%9D%8E%E6%AE%89

10th-century Chinese poets
10th-century Iranian people
Chinese people of Iranian descent
Executed Later Tang people
Executed people from Sichuan
Five Dynasties and Ten Kingdoms imperial consorts
Former Shu poets
Iranian women poets
Chinese women poets
People executed by Later Tang
Poets from Sichuan
Writers from Mianyang
10th-century Chinese women
10th-century Chinese people
Chinese concubines
10th-century Chinese women writers
900 births
926 deaths
Year of birth uncertain